Michael Rummenigge (born 3 February 1964) is a German former professional footballer who played as a forward.

Career
Rummenigge was born in Lippstadt, North Rhine-Westphalia. At the beginning of his career, he did not have it easy as a player with the Bayern Munich star team. He was often compared to his older brother, Karl-Heinz Rummenigge, captain of FC Bayern Munich and the German national team. Rummenigge joined Bayern Munich in 1981 as a member of the German junior national team at the age of 17, coming from Borussia Lippstadt. His brother, Karl-Heinz, was already an international top star player. Rummenigge became a professional player in Munich in 1982 and a starter in his second season in 1983. He played for Bayern Munich till 1988. By that time his team had won the German championship three times and the DFB-Pokal two times (in 1984 and 1986).

During his career, Rummenigge was capped twice for the German national team and represented Germany on two occasions in 1983 and 1986.

In 1988, he changed team affiliation to Borussia Dortmund. In spite of not being very popular with Borussia's supporters in the beginning, he won the DFB-Pokal with Dortmund by the end of his first season – the first title for Borussia Dortmund since the 1960s. Borussia Dortmund defeated Werder Bremen 4–1 in Berlin.

In 1991–92, after the arrival of the new BVB coach, Ottmar Hitzfeld, he was appointed captain of the team. In the same year, Borussia Dortmund became the runner-up in the German championship. In 1993, he played in the UEFA Cup final for Borussia Dortmund against Juventus. Dortmund lost 6–1 on aggregate with Rummenigge scoring their only goal.

Rummenigge finished his career in the black and yellow football shirt of Dortmund in 1993. After having played 309 times in the Bundesliga and having scored 80 goals, he moved on to Japan where a professional football league had just been launched. He played for Urawa Red Diamonds, Japan till 1995. At the beginning of 1996 he had to give up his career because of a severe toe injury.

Business

Rummenigge is a trained banker and runs a successful sports marketing agency in Dortmund (Sports & Business) as well as commercial football camps (Fußballschule Michael Rummenigge). In addition he is a partner/shareholder of the Sportnex GmbH in Munich.

He is also a partner of "Germany's best indoor soccer courts" in Münster and launched (together with a different partner) another new business, "Trendsport Rummenigge", which distributes mobile soccer courts, cages and playing fields.

Rummenigge also shows a remarkable social commitment. He works as patron for the initiative "NO DRUGS" – an initiative against drug abuse and also for the association Childrensmile e. V. which supports severely ill and disadvantaged children.

In June 2007, he passed his exam to be a professional football coach with distinction (UEFA Pro licence) at the German sport university in Cologne.

Personal life
Rummenigge is married to Carolin and has three sons.

Career statistics

Club
Source:

International

Honours
Bayern Munich
 Bundesliga: 1984–85, 1985–86, 1986–87
 DFB-Pokal: 1983–84, 1985–86
 DFL-Supercup: 1987
 European Cup: runner-up 1986–87

Borussia Dortmund
 DFB-Pokal: 1988–89
 DFL-Supercup: 1989
 UEFA Cup: runner-up 1992–93

References

External links
 
 
 
 

1964 births
Living people
People from Lippstadt
Sportspeople from Arnsberg (region)
German expatriate sportspeople in Japan
German footballers
German expatriate footballers
Germany international footballers
Germany under-21 international footballers
Association football midfielders
FC Bayern Munich footballers
Borussia Dortmund players
Urawa Red Diamonds players
Expatriate footballers in Japan
J1 League players
Bundesliga players
Footballers from North Rhine-Westphalia
West German footballers